The Big Creek Bridge is a bowstring arch bridge that spans Big Creek on U.S. Route 101 in Lane County, Oregon. It was designed by Conde McCullough and opened in 1931.

The locations for all three bridges were similar in that the sandy foundations were not secure enough for the abutment piers required to relieve the lateral pressure of traditional arches. The flood levels of the rivers approached the road grade and ruled out the use of reinforced concrete girders. The corrosive salt air eliminated the practicality of steel truss bridges. The design of the bridge was similar to the rainbow arch design patented by James Barney Marsh.

The bridge, along with the Ten Mile Creek Bridge and the Wilson River Bridge, was rehabilitated in 1996 to increase the overhead clearance and add a cathodic protection system to protect the embedded steel reinforcement against the corrosive air. A project to replace the cathodic protection system began in February 2014.

See also

List of bridges documented by the Historic American Engineering Record in Oregon
List of bridges on U.S. Route 101 in Oregon
List of bridges on the National Register of Historic Places in Oregon

References

External links

Bridges completed in 1931
Through arch bridges in the United States
Road bridges on the National Register of Historic Places in Oregon
U.S. Route 101
National Register of Historic Places in Lane County, Oregon
Bridges in Lane County, Oregon
Tied arch bridges in the United States
Historic American Engineering Record in Oregon
Bridges by Conde McCullough
1931 establishments in Oregon
Bridges of the United States Numbered Highway System
Neoclassical architecture in Oregon
Art Deco architecture in Oregon
Concrete bridges in the United States